Barcelona Sporting Club's 2016 season is the club 91st year of existence, and its 58th participation in the top level of professional football in Ecuador. Barcelona is one of the twelve participating clubs in the top flight of Ecuadorian Football Championship 2016. In addition to the national tournament, the "canarios" are going to play the Copa Sudamericana 2016.

Pre-season and friendlies

Competitions

Overall

Overview

Serie A

First stage

Stage table

Results summary

Results by round

Matches

Second stage

Stage table

Results summary

Results by round

Matches

Aggregate table

Copa Sudamericana

First stage

References

External links 
 

Barcelona S.C. seasons
Barcelona Sporting Club